AQS may refer to:

 Aviation Quality Services, a division of Lufthansa Flight Training
 AQS Inc., manufacturer of the main circuit board for the Novena (computing platform) open-source laptop computer
 AQS-13, a series of US Navy helicopter dipping sonars